Thyatira vicina is a moth in the family Drepanidae. It was described by Achille Guenée in 1852. It is found on Java and Bali in Indonesia.

Subspecies
Thyatira vicina vicina (Java)
Thyatira vicina baliensis Werny, 1966 (Bali)

References

Moths described in 1852
Thyatirinae